Anna Kimberley (born 11 March 1995) is an English female professional squash player. She reached her highest career ranking of 82 in April 2018.

References 

1995 births
Living people
English female squash players
Sportspeople from Ipswich